Kaslian (Urdu:کسلیاں) is a village, union council, and administrative subdivision of Jhelum District in the Punjab Province of Pakistan. It is part of Pind Dadan Khan Tehsil.

References 

Populated places in Tehsil  Pind Dadan Khan
Union councils of Pind Dadan Khan Tehsil